Redditch is a constituency in Worcestershire, England, represented in the House of Commons of the UK Parliament since 2017 by Rachel Maclean of the Conservative Party, who is currently a minister in the Department for Levelling Up, Housing and Communities.

Members of Parliament

Constituency profile
From 1983 to 1997 the town of Redditch was, based on a series of high majorities, in the Conservative safe seat of Mid Worcestershire. The first MP for that constituency, Eric Forth, moved to the equally safe seat of Bromley and Chislehurst in south east London as a result of major boundary changes in Worcestershire for the 1997 general election, and held that seat until his death in 2006.  The seat has been a bellwether since 1997.

Boundaries 

This seat is located in Worcestershire and contains the whole borough of Redditch and parts of the district of Wychavon.  To make the size of the constituency's electorate suitable, the nearby villages of Inkberrow, Callow Hill, Cookhill, Feckenham, and Astwood Bank were included upon the constituency's creation in 1997. For the 2010 general election the villages of Hanbury and the Lenches have been included, and the constituency reclassified from Borough to County.

History
Redditch was created in 1997 following major changes to the Mid Worcestershire constituency. The Mid Worcestershire seat has been a much safer seat for the Conservatives since 1997 than beforehand, due to the Labour-voting wards within Redditch being taken out and made into its own constituency as it is today. There are nonetheless some Conservative-voting wards in the town, and the rural areas of the constituency are also strongly Conservative.

Elections

Elections in the 2010s

Elections in the 2000s

Elections in the 1990s

See also 
 List of parliamentary constituencies in Herefordshire and Worcestershire

Notes

References

Redditch
Parliamentary constituencies in Worcestershire
Constituencies of the Parliament of the United Kingdom established in 1997